The 2022 UCI Junior Track Cycling World Championships were the annual Junior World Championship for track cycling hold at Tel Aviv, Israel from 23 to 27 August 2022.

Medal summary
{| 
|- style="background:#ccc; width:100%;"
|colspan=7 align=center|Men's events
|-
|Sprint
|colspan=2|
|colspan=2|
|colspan=2|
|-
|Team sprint
|valign=top|Ryan ElliottMaxwell LiebeknechtDylan Stanton || 44.538
|valign=top|Pete FlemmingLuca SpiegelDanny WernerTorben Osterheld || 45.104
|valign=top|Luke BlackwoodLiam CavanaghJaxson Russell || 45.838
|-
|1 km time trial
| || 1:02.531
| || 1:02.650
| || 1:03.058
|-
|Keirin
|colspan=2|
|colspan=2|
|colspan=2|
|- 
|Individual pursuit
| || 3:10.889
| || 3:11.040
| || caughtopponent|-
|Team pursuit
|valign=top|Renato FaveroAlessio Delle VedoveLuca GiaimiMatteo FiorinAndrea Raccagni Noviero || 3:58.853
|valign=top|Tobias MüllerBen JochumBruno KesslerJasper SchröderLeon Arenz || 4:00.779
|valign=top|Kyle AitkenLewis JohnstonJoel DouglasOliver Watson PalmerEdward Pawson || 4:10.330
|-
|Elimination race
|colspan=2|
|colspan=2|
|colspan=2|
|-
|Points race
| || 72 pts
| || 70 pts
| || 49 pts
|-
|Scratch
|colspan=2|
|colspan=2|
|colspan=2|
|-
|Omnium
| || 120 pts
| || 111 pts
| || 109 pts
|-
|Madison
|Milan KadlecRadovan Štec || 34 pts
|Valentyn KabashnyiDaniil Yakovlev || 25 pts
|Bruno KesslerJasper Schröder || 21 pts
|- style="background:#ccc; width:100%;"
|colspan=7 align=center| Women's events
|-
|Sprint
|colspan=2|
|colspan=2|
|colspan=2|
|-
|Team sprint
|valign=top|Lara JägerStella MüllerClara SchneiderBente Lürmann || 49.888
|valign=top|Sophie MarrTyler PuzichaEmma Stevens || 50.933
|valign=top|Anna JaborníkováNatálie MikšaníkováSára Peterková || 50.692
|-
|500 m time trial
| || 34.871
| || 35.048
| || 35.448
|-
|Keirin
|colspan=2|
|colspan=2|
|colspan=2|
|- 
|Individual pursuit
| || 2:22.891
| || 2:28.887
| || 2:22.749
|-
|Team pursuit
|valign=top|Clémence ChéreauAurore PernolletHeïdi GaugainLara Lallemant || 4:25.480
|valign=top|Martina SanfilippoFederica VenturelliFrancesca PellegriniValentina ZanziVittoria Grassi || 4:33.800
|valign=top|Justyna CzaplaMagdalena FuchsSeana Littbarski-GrayHannah KunzJette Simon || 4:32.665
|-
|Elimination race
|colspan=2|
|colspan=2|
|colspan=2|
|-
|Points race
| || 45 pts
| || 30 pts
| || 26 pts
|-
|Scratch
|colspan=2|
|colspan=2|
|colspan=2|
|-
|Omnium
| || 119 pts
| || 106 pts
| || 104 pts
|-
|Madison
|Grace ListerZoe Bäckstedt || 53 pts
|Maho KakitaMizuki Ikeda || 42 pts
|Babette van der WolfNienke Veenhoven || 13 pts
|}

Notes
 Competitors named in italics'' only participated in rounds prior to the final.

Medal table

References

External links
Results
Results book

UCI Juniors Track World Championships
UCI Junior Track Cycling World Championships
UCI Junior Track Cycling World Championships
International cycle races hosted by Israel
UCI Junior Track Cycling World Championships
Sports competitions in Tel Aviv
2020s in Tel Aviv